The 20th Venice Biennale, held in 1936, was an exhibition of international contemporary art, with 13 participating nations. The Venice Biennale takes place biennially in Venice, Italy.

References

Bibliography

Further reading 

 
 
 
 
 
 
 
 
 

1936 in art
1936 in Italy
Venice Biennale exhibitions